This is a list of symphonies in A major.  It includes all symphonies in the key of A major written by notable composers.

See also

For symphonies in other keys, see List of symphonies by key.

Notes

References

A major
Symphonies